Lindsay Street Park is a public park in the English Avenue neighborhood of Atlanta, Georgia. Opened in 2015, it is the first park to be opened in English Avenue

History 

Prior to 2015, the English Avenue neighborhood in Atlanta did not have a public park. Construction on Lindsay Street Park began on April 4, 2014, when associates of the Blank Family of Businesses, including Arthur Blank, Thomas Dimitroff, Rich McKay and Mike Smith broke ground on the new park. Blank had helped fund the construction of the park through the Arthur Blank Family Foundation, with other donations coming from Invest Atlanta, U-Haul, and Park Pride, among other groups. The area the park was built on had previously been the site of six abandoned lots. Park Pride had worked for three years to convert the property to a greenspace as part of their "Parks with Purpose" program, in conjunction with The Conservation Fund. The project cost approximately $750,000. On October 21, 2015, Atlanta Mayor Kasim Reed officially opened the park. This park was the first in a series of parks constructed in the area in conjunction with The Conservation Fund that have included Kathryn Johnston Memorial Park and an expansion to the nearby Vine City Park. The park is part of a plan to help alleviate urban blight in the area and help in water management. A small stream that runs through the park flows into nearby Proctor Creek.

References

Bibliography 

 
 
 
 
 
 
 
 

Parks in Atlanta
English Avenue and Vine City